The International Federation of Catholic Universities (IFCU) is an organisation of over 200 Catholic universities throughout the world.

History
Founded in 1924. Created by a Papal Decree in 1948 as the Fœderatio Universitatum Catholicarum it became the International Federation of Catholic Universities in 1965. The federation has its origins in collaboration in 1924 between the Università Cattolica del Sacro Cuore in Milan and the Catholic university of Nijmegen in the Netherlands. The FIUC facilitates, research, partnership and exchange programmes between catholic institutes of education. The secretariat is in Paris; Institut Catholique de Paris.

Regional groups

The IFCU is broken up into a number of regions of the world:
 Federation of European Catholic Universities (FUCE)
 Association of Catholic Universities and Institutes of Africa and Madagascar (ACUIAM)
 Association of Southeast and East Asian Catholic Colleges and Universities (ASEACCU)
 The Organisation of Catholic Universities in Latin America (ODUCAL)
 Association of Catholic Colleges and Universities (ACCU) in North America
 The Xavier Board of Higher Education in India

List of Secretaries-General
 François Mabille, November 2019

References

External links 
Official Website

1948 establishments
1948 in Christianity
Catholic education
International college and university associations and consortia
Catholic universities and colleges
International associations of the faithful